Crynant New Colliery Halt railway station served the colliery in the village of Crynant, in the historical county of Glamorganshire, Wales, from 1938 to 1954 on the Neath and Brecon Railway.

History 
The station was opened in September 1938 by the Great Western Railway. It didn't appear in the timetable as it was only open to the miners of the nearby Crynant Colliery. It closed in 1954.

References 

Disused railway stations in Neath Port Talbot
Railway stations in Great Britain opened in 1938
Railway stations in Great Britain closed in 1954
1938 establishments in Wales
1954 disestablishments in Wales